Kerlin Blaise (born December 25, 1974) is a former American football guard who played six 
seasons with the Detroit Lions of the National Football League. He played college football at the University of Miami and attended Maynard Evans High School in Orlando, Florida.

References

External links
Just Sports Stats

Living people
1974 births
Players of American football from Orlando, Florida
American football offensive guards
African-American players of American football
Miami Hurricanes football players
Detroit Lions players
21st-century African-American sportspeople
20th-century African-American sportspeople